The Fairy-Tale Detectives is the first book in The Sisters Grimm series written by Michael Buckley.

Plot summary

Eleven-year-old Sabrina and seven-year-old Daphne are orphans who go to live with their grandmother (who they thought was dead) in the small town of Ferryport Landing, New York. After the kidnapping of their parents and going through countless abusive foster homes, Sabrina is incredibly suspicious and hesitant to trust their grandmother. Sabrina, having been told her whole life that her grandmother is dead, believes she is an imposter. 'Granny' lives with a man named Mr. Canis, who she says helps her take care of the house. They soon find out that their grandmother is a very strange person. Her house is filled with fairy tale books. Her dog, Elvis, initially attacks Sabrina. Her door has eight locks and eight different keys, her car has a rope rather than a seatbelt and they are told that they aren't allowed to let anyone or anything in the house without Granny or Canis' permission first. Granny claims that she was very close with their parents and has received letters from them in the past. That night, Sabrina attempts to escape with Daphne through the woods but they are attacked by small bugs that resemble fireflies. When Granny finds them, she refers to the bugs as pixies, and keeps them away with a mysterious blue dust that seems to put them to sleep. Granny doesn't seem angry, but she has their windows nailed shut.

Afterwards, Granny and Mr. Canis drive with the girls through the town, eventually reaching what appears to be the scene of a crime; a house that has been completely crushed into rubble. Granny and Canis leave the girls alone to go investigate the scene and while Sabrina and Daphne wait, they encounter Mr. Seven and his employer, Mr. Charming. Both seem to have a serious disdain for the Grimm Family, despite being familiar with Granny and Mr. Canis. Granny finds a fresh leaf on the ground and decides that it's from a beanstalk, but Mr. Charming seems eager to dismiss and cover up the case. Granny tells the girls she believes the house has been stepped on by a giant. Sabrina thinks she's gone crazy, and Daphne thinks she's joking, but later they both realize that the rubble is sitting in the indentation of a massive footprint. At the house, Granny finally informs the girls that they are late descendants of the Brothers Grimm.

She tells them that every fairy tale the Brothers Grimm wrote was actually an accurate account of something that really happened. She explains that in the past, fairy tale creatures, or 'Everafters', and normal humans lived side by side. However, much later in history, as tensions grew, magic was banned and any dangerous Everafters were captured and caged. The Grimm brothers collected and documented as many stories as they could of Everafters, and became friends with many of them in the process. Many everafters moved to America to build a safe community, with Wilhelm Grimm as their leader. As the human population began to grow, rebel groups formed in Ferryport landing in order to eradicate the human population. In order to prevent an all out war, Wilhelm Grimm went to Baba Yaga, a powerful witch, and asked her to put a spell over the town keeping all everafters in permanently. Baba Yaga granted this in exchange for Wilhelm's freedom, meaning one grimm would always have to stay in Ferryport Landing for the spell to stay intact. Granny tells them that the peace in Ferryport Landing is fragile, and it's the Grimm Family's job to maintain it.

The family later goes to the hospital to visit the farmer who was injured in the giant accident, only to find that Mr. Charming (revealed to be Prince Charming) has beaten them and erased the farmer's memory. Despite this, they interview the farmer's wife at his bedside. The farmer's wife, Mrs. Applebee, informs them that her husband had sworn he'd seen a giant, but she believes a different theory. She says there was a British man who often visited their farm and asked to rent their field, but became hostile when they refused. She says that later, the man had returned, apologized for being so rude, and offered to pay for them to stay in New York City as an apology. Mrs. Applebee had gone with her sister rather than her husband. When they arrived, the hotel had no record of their reservation. On the way out, the family is ambushed by a group of 'goons' who threaten the Grimms to abandon the case. Granny is not scared, and instead sees this as a sign they are on the right path. Granny decides to follow the gang and find out who employed them in a stakeout. On the way, she tells them about giants. the only person to ever have successfully robbed and killed a giant was Jack,(from Jack and the Beanstalk), but now he works at a retail store in town. On the stakeout, while granny and canis are distracted, sabrina makes an attempt to escape with Daphne, despite Daphne's protests. just after they leave the car, it is attacked by a giant. The giant, chanting about how he must find "the englishman" picks up the car, containing granny and canis, and walks away with it, leaving the girls alone in the woods with only granny's handbag. They try to hitchhike, but encounter Officer Hamstead, one of the three little pigs. He offers to drive the girls home, but they discover he works for Mr. Charming, and make an escape. The girls follow pixie lights into the woods and soon meet Puck (from A Midsummer Night's Dream). Puck originally believes they are spies and tries to drown them, claiming they have stolen the old lady away from him. they mistake  him for the infamous Peter Pan, which enrages him even further. He originally decides that he won't help them find granny because he is a self-proclaimed villain. Ultimately he follows them home, helps them get back into the house, and agrees to help them save their grandmother just because she was kind to him and fed him since he was little. Puck and Sabrina share a clear hatred for each other and spend the majority of the time bickering. Sabrina and Daphne find their father's diary, detailing his accounts with Mayor Charming. It reveals that the upcoming fundraiser ball at prince charming's mansion is a scam he created to make money after a series of business fails. They also find out that giants are very gullible. They theorize that Mayor Charming tricked a giant into crushing the house for him, and that Mayor Charming is the 'Englishman'.

The girls later find a letter in granny's purse telling them to enter the room in her house that she previously declared off limits. Inside, they discover the Magic Mirror from Snow White that is in their home. They can ask the Mirror any rhyming question, and it will answer. They first ask if granny is alive, to which the mirror replies that both her and canis are okay. They then find out that they are still in the car in the giant's shirt pocket. When they ask who they can go to, to help defeat the giant, the mirror shows them Jack the giant killer, sitting in a cell. At the same time, they are pursued by the police, Officers Hamstead, Swineheart, and Boarman (from The Three Little Pigs). Sabrina, Daphne, and Puck escape the house on a magic carpet and fly to the Ferryport Landing prison where they rescue Jack. The officer guarding Jack is Ichabod Crane (from "Sleepy Hollow"), so the girls disguise themselves as the Headless Horseman to distract him while Jack escapes. While they fly away, Jack purposefully attracts attention from the police. Then the giant makes a reappearance and chases them through town, causing destruction everywhere they go. Jack seems to enjoy the attention, while Sabrina and Daphne struggle to stay on the carpet. They get home and Jack decides they should spend the night, though Sabrina is hesitant to let him stay in their house. Late at night, Puck and Sabrina discuss their distrust for Jack, only to stumble upon him and the dog in a fight. Puck accuses Jack of having 'sticky fingers', or thieving. They briefly fight before the girls stop them. Jack keeps mentioning his "big plan", but refraining from telling the girls what it is. After this secrecy causes Sabrina to finally snap and ream Jack, he reveals that his plan is for them to sneak into Charming's office during the fundraiser ball and steal his city planning blueprints. Jack believes this will lead them to wherever Charming wants to send the giant next.

The group uses the mirror to get disguises as well as the Ruby Slippers from The Wizard of Oz. Sabrina (disguised as Momma Bear from Goldilocks) and Daphne (disguised as the Tin Man) are told by the mirror that their disguises will wear off at nine o' clock. The sisters use the magic slippers to get into Charming's mansion. The girls encounter many fairy tale creatures who all discuss Granny Relda's incident with the giant. The whole town is familiar with the Grimm family. The Everafters have a blatant disdain for the Grimms and loudly discuss how they hope the family will soon die out so they can leave the town. They are only interrupted by Briar Rose, or Sleeping Beauty, who defends the Grimm family. The girls also find out that there is a possibility that their parents were kidnapped rather than just having abandoned the girls. Sabrina sneaks away into the mayor's office, where she finds tape recordings of the giant crushing the farmer's house. Suddenly, Sabrina is caught by Prince Charming, who already has Daphne. He threatens to kill them if they don't tell him who they really are. He also mentions that he doesn't want to join the "Scarlet Hand", a 'revolution'. The girls change back into themselves just in time, as a giant arrives outside the party. Charming attempts to throw them outside, but the party has formed a mob that is impossible to penetrate. The Three Witches start to fight the giant, which Daphne protests as Granny and Canis are still in its pocket.

King Arthur and the Knights of the Round Table fight the giant off, and the guests leave the party, enraged with Charming. The girls demand that Charming give them their grandmother back, sure that he is in control of the giant. However, Charming's tapes reveal the real culprit: Jack, who had tricked them and who was the one who had set loose the giant hoping that by killing it in front of a crowd of news reporters he would come back into his former fame. Charming sent Hamstead to take them out of town long enough to kill the giant and save their grandmother. The girls ask why Charming would want to help them, and he replies 'I have my reasons'. They return home quickly after this realization to find that Jack has ransacked their home and injured Elvis. Jack has stolen several magic beans from the Mirror. Charming and the girls get weapons from the mirror and go to fight Jack, who has released a new giant and is attempting to anger it. Sabrina accidentally kills the giant with Excalibur and enrages Jack. Jack tries to kill Sabrina and Daphne but they are rescued by Mr. Canis, who turns out to be the Big Bad Wolf and the giant is sent back to its kingdom accompanied by Jack to meet its queen.

The girls discover that a shady organization known as the "Scarlet Hand" is responsible for kidnapping their parents. It is also revealed that Puck will be moving in with them.

Characters
 Sabrina Grimm
 Daphne Grimm
 Granny Relda Grimm
 Mr. Canis
 Puck
 Mayor Charming
 Mr. Seven
 Jack the Giant Killer
 Sheriff Hamstead
 Officer Boarman
 Officer Swinehart
 Elvis (dog)
 Mirror
 Ichabod Crane

2005 American novels
2005 children's books
2005 fantasy novels
American children's novels
American fantasy novels
American mystery novels
Children's fantasy novels
Children's mystery novels